Valeriy Vdovin (Russian Cyrillic: Валерий Вдовин) is a Russian football manager who took the Laos U23 to the 2005 AFF U-23 Youth Championship. He also managed the Laos U23 team in preparation for the 2009 SEA Games.

Laos

Under Vdovin, Laos rose 28 places in the FIFA World Rankings, to 162nd place, a position seemingly insurmountable to minnow nations. They finished seventh in the 2007 Tiger Cup and 2008 AFF Suzuki Cup with Vdovin in charge.

References

External links
 Тренер Валерий Вдовин: про знаменитый «Спартак» и азиатский футбол
 Футбол в его крови

Russian football managers
Soviet footballers
Russian expatriate football managers
Living people
1959 births
Russian footballers
Association footballers not categorized by position
Russian expatriate sportspeople in Laos
Expatriate football managers in Laos